Bernard Meunier (born 11 March 1947) is a French chemist and academic. He has been a member of the Académie des sciences since 1999.

Career 
After a doctorate at the University of Montpellier in November 1971 under the supervision of Robert Corriu, he obtained a state doctorate at the University of Paris-Sud in Orsay in June 1977 (with Hugh Felkin as thesis supervisor).

After a post-doctoral fellowship at Oxford University (September 1977 - August 1978) he joined the CNRS Coordination Chemistry Laboratory in Toulouse in September 1979. He joined the CNRS in January 1973 in Gif-sur-Yvette at the CNRS Institute of Natural Substances Chemistry, where he rose through all levels to become Director of Research specialising in oxidation chemistry, particularly in the field of biology and therapeutic chemistry (antitumours, antiparasites and regulators of copper homeostasis in Alzheimer's disease).

From 1993 to 2006, he was associate professor at the École Polytechnique. He was appointed President of the CNRS on 20 October 2004, a position he held until his resignation on 5 January 2006. He has been Director of Research Emeritus at the CNRS since September 2012 and Visiting Professor at the Guangdong University of Technology (China) since the same date.

He was invited professor at the Collège de France (2014-1015) on the Innovation Chair supported by the Liliane Bettencourt Foundation.

Distinctions

Prizes 

 Silver medal from the CNRS in 1991 Clavel-Lespieau
Prize of the Académie des sciences in 1997
Descartes-Huygens Prize in 2001
Gay-Lussac Humboldt Prize in 2002
Achille-Le-Bel Grand Prize of the Société chimique de France in 2007
Elected on 11 December 2012 as Vice-President of the Académie des sciences for the period 2013-2014
Elected on 18 November 2014 as President of the Académie des sciences for the period 2015-2016
Prize of the Cercle d'Oc (Toulouse) in 2015

Honours 

 Member of the Academie des sciences since 22 November 1999
 Correspondant member of the Académie des sciences inscriptions et belles lettres of Toulouse (Science Class) in 2001
 Foreign member of the Polish Academy of Sciences since 2005
 Full member of the Académie des sciences, inscriptions et belles lettres of Toulouse (Science Class) in 2009
 Associate member of the Académie national de Pharmacie since 4 December 2013
 Visiting professor at the Collège de France for the year 2014-2015 (Liliane Bettencourt Chair of Technological Innovation). His course is entitled "Therapeutic innovation: developments and trends"

Décorations 

 Officier of the Légion d'honneur. He was promoted to officier by decree on April 3, 2015. He was Chevalier on November 14, 2006.

Publications 

 L'homme oublié du canal de Panama, Adolphe Godin de Lépinay, CNRS Éditions, Paris, 2018, 
Chimique, vous osez dire chimique?, CNRS Éditions, Paris, 2022,

References

Sources 

 Bernard Meunier on the CNRS website

1947 births
Living people
20th-century French chemists
Members of the French Academy of Sciences
University of Montpellier alumni
21st-century French chemists
Research directors of the French National Centre for Scientific Research